Mosko Alkalai (March 10, 1931 – April 1, 2008) was an Israeli actor. He was best known for a string of hits including Blaumilch Canal, The Fox in the Chicken Coop and Yana's Friends.

Career
Born in Bucharest to a Romanian Sephardi-Jewish family, Alkalai's career in acting started relatively late, though his career in film and theater roles spanned 40 years. He appeared in dozens of Israeli films and theater productions. Alkalai was extremely active in professional organizations within the Israeli entertainment industry.  He served as the chairman of the Israeli Union of Performing Arts. and was also a member of the Israeli Film Academy and the Israeli Arts Council. Alkalai was the 2003 winner of the Israeli Film Academy's lifetime Achievement Award.

Personal life
Mosko Alkalai died of respiratory failure at the age of 77 on April 1, 2008, in Tel Aviv. He had undergone surgery at Tel Aviv Sourasky Medical Center several weeks prior to his death, but never recovered. His casket was placed at the Habima Theatre in Tel Aviv before he was buried at Kiryat Shaul Cemetery. He was survived by his wife, Rodika, and their two sons, Ron and Shai.

Partial filmography

Ervinka (1967) - Zigler
Ha-Ben Ha'Oved (1968)
Blaumilch Canal (1969) - Zelig Schultheiss
Madron (1970) - Claude (uncredited)
Bloomfield (1971) - 1st Committee Man
7 fois... par jour (1971)
Salomonico (1972)
Hagiga Le'enayim (1975)
Hagiga B'Snuker (1975) - Azriel's Employer
Ha-Diber Ha-11 (1975)
Hamesh Ma'ot Elef Shahor (1975)
Ha-Shu'al B'Lool Hatarnagalot (1978) - Tzemach Goorevitch
Jesus (1979) - Matthew
Repeat Dive (1982)
Edut Me'ones (1984) - Belkin
Goodbye, New York (1985) - Papalovski
Nadia (1986) - English Teacher
The Delta Force (1986) - TV reporter
Bar 51 (1986) - Karl
Le testament d'un poète juif assassiné (1988) - Paltiel's Father
Meeting Venus (1991) - Jean Gabor
Revenge of Itzik Finkelstein (1993)
Mehapeset Baal Al Arba (1993)
The Mummy Lives (1993) - Kroll
Ha-Gamal Hame'ofef (1994)
Ein Shemot Al Hadlatot (1997) - Kuba
Voyages (1999) - Shimon
Yana's Friends (1999) - Yitzhak
Shisha Million Rasisim (2001) - Yitzhak
The Holy Land (2001) - Professor Milan 
Rashevski's Tango (2003) - Rabbi Shmouel
Alenbi Romance (2005)
Eskimosim ba Galil (2006) - Mundek
Julia Mia (2007) - Johnny's father
King of Beggars (2007) - Yankalle Soffer
Landsman (2009) - Ze'ev Landsman (final film role)

References

External links

The Jerusalem Post: In Appreciation: Moscu Alkalai, 1931-2008

1931 births
2008 deaths
Male actors from Bucharest
Male actors from Tel Aviv
Israeli male film actors
Israeli male stage actors
Israeli male television actors
20th-century Israeli male actors
21st-century Israeli male actors
Romanian emigrants to Israel
Israeli people of Romanian-Jewish descent
Israeli Sephardi Jews
Romanian Sephardi Jews
Romanian Jews in Israel
Respiratory disease deaths in Israel
Deaths from respiratory failure
Burials at Kiryat Shaul Cemetery